The QJY-88, also known as the Type 88 LMG (Chinese: 88式通用机枪, 1988 shì tōngyòng jīqiāng; English: 1988 model general purpose machine gun), is a 5.8x42mm Chinese light machine gun designed in the late 1980s by China North Industries Corporation, otherwise known as Norinco. It was intended to replace the obsolete Type 67 machine gun in service with the PLA.

Design
The GPMG was created with first prototypes designed in 1989 before it was approved for production in 1999. A variant with a heavier barrel, longer flash hider, and an electric solenoid trigger that replaces the buttstock, named QJT88 (QJT5.8), is designed for vehicle coaxial usage.

Users

 : Claimed to have been retired by the PLA and replaced by QJY-201. Still in use by Chinese law enforcement.

Non-State Actors
 Tamil Tigers

See also
 QJS-161
 QBB-95
 HK MG4
 HK MG5
 IMI Negev
 RPL-20
 Daewoo Precision Industries K3
 Ultimax 100
 FN MAG
 FN Minimi
 FN EVOLYS
 M60 machine gun
 M249 light machine gun
 PK machine gun
 PKP Pecheneg machine gun
 Sumitomo Type 62

References

Light machine guns
Machine guns of the People's Republic of China
5.8 mm firearms